In molecular biology mir-638 microRNA is a short RNA molecule. MicroRNAs function to regulate the expression levels of other genes by several mechanisms.

Expression in lupus nephritis
miR-638 has been implicated in the pathogenesis of lupus nephritis (LN), with intra-renal expression levels differing between normal and lupus nephritis patients. The degree of difference in expression levels further correlates with the degree of disease severity in each LN patient.

miR-638 and gastric cancer
miR-638 levels are significantly downregulated in gastric cancer cell lines, along with deregulation of 23 other miRNAs. Thus miR-628 is likely to be involved in the development and progression of gastric cancer.

Further applications
miR-638 has additionally been found to be upregulated in the K562 leukaemic cell line.

See also 
 MicroRNA

References

Further reading

External links 
 

MicroRNA
MicroRNA precursor families